Joëlle Bernard (1928–1977) was a French film and television actress.

Partial filmography

 Lunegarde (1946)
 Quai des Orfèvres (1947) - Ginette (uncredited)
 To the Eyes of Memory (1948) - (uncredited)
 Miquette (1950) - Lili - une comédienne
 Here Is the Beauty (1950) - (uncredited)
 Beware of Blondes (1950) - Une entraîneuse (uncredited)
 Les maîtres-nageurs (1951) - Dorothy
 Si ça vous chante (1951)
 Casque d'Or (1952) - Une fille à la guinguette (uncredited)
 Desperate Decision (1952) - La femme ivre
 The Long Teeth (1953) - Raymonde Josserand
 Rue de l'Estrapade (1953) - La voisine de Robert (uncredited)
 Horizons sans fin (1953) - (uncredited)
 The Slave (1953) - Jenny
 Children of Love (1953) - Dolly
 Stain in the Snow (1954) - Une fille
 The Price of Love (1955) - Suzy
 Sophie et le crime (1955) - La fille au restaurant (uncredited)
 Le Long des trottoirs (1956) - Monique
 O.S.S. 117 n'est pas mort (1957)
 Three Days to Live (1957) - Mauricette
 Ces dames préfèrent le mambo (1957) - Mamie O'Brien
 Women's Prison (1958) - Une détenue
 Pêcheur d'Islande (1959) - Jenny
 Les Amants de demain (1959) - Yvonne
 Sergent X (1960)
 Interpol Against X (1960) - Lucy
 Callaghan remet ça (1961)
 Emile's Boat (1962) - La patronne de La Marine
 The Gentleman from Epsom (1962) - Ginette
 Du mouron pour les petits oiseaux (1963) - Gladys
 Graduation Year (1964) - La fille du "Rendez-vous des chasseurs"
 Diary of a Chambermaid (1964)
 Angelique and the King (1966) - La Voisin (uncredited)
 Sept hommes et une garce (1967) - La cantinière
 Adélaïde (1968) - Janine
 The Adding Machine (1969) - Janine
 L'alliance (1970) - (uncredited)
 Ils (1970) - Isabelle
 Comptes à rebours (1971) - Suzy
 Le Viager (1972) - La prosttituée
 Borsalino & Co. (1974) - Une maquerelle (uncredited)
 Les Enquetes du Commissaire Maigret (1974, TV Series) - Ernestine, dite 'La grande perche'
 Speak to Me of Love (1975) - La mère de Daniel
 Les conquistadores (1976)
 Le guêpier (1976) - Sarah

References

Bibliography
 Edward Baron Turk. Child of Paradise: Marcel Carné and the Golden Age of French Cinema. Harvard University Press, 1989.
 http://kmalden.centerblog.net/108-joelle-bernard-1928-1977

External links

People from Vitry-le-François
1928 births
1977 deaths
French film actresses
1977 suicides
20th-century French women
Suicides in France